Communication skill or communication skills may refer to:

Rhetoric, the facility of speakers or writers to inform, persuade, or motivate particular audiences
Communication, the activity of conveying information through speech, writing, or other behavior
English studies, an academic discipline that studies the English language